Isla is an unincorporated community in northeastern Sabine County, Texas, United States.

It is located at the junction of State Highway 87 and Farm to Market Road 276, eleven miles northeast of Hemphill.

A post office was established in 1896 and by the mid-1930s, Isla had an estimated population of twenty-five and three businesses.

Unincorporated communities in Sabine County, Texas
Unincorporated communities in Texas